Surachai Chawna (born March 23, 1999) is a Thai professional footballer who plays as an attacking midfielder for Khon Kaen in the Thai League 3.

References

External links
 at Soccerway

1999 births
Living people
Surachai Chawna
Association football midfielders
Surachai Chawna
Surachai Chawna
Surachai Chawna
Surachai Chawna
Surachai Chawna